Bjørnbreen is a glacier in Wedel Jarlsberg Land at Spitsbergen, Svalbard. It has a length of about ten kilometers, and is a branch of Recherchebreen, located between the ridges of Kvartsittkammen and Gothankammen.

References

Glaciers of Spitsbergen